Heddalsvatnet is a lake in the municipalities Notodden and Sauherad in Vestfold og Telemark, Norway. The main influx comes from the rivers Tinnelva and Heddøla. The lake covers an area of 11.9 km2 or 13.2 km2 according to NVE. The catchment basin covers a total area of 5380,5 km2.

The southern part of the lake is called Bråfjorden and is separated from the northern part by Nautsundet strait crossed county road 360 bridge. The railway line to Notodden (the Bratsberg Line) runs along the eastern shore.

The lake is part of the Skien watershed and is connected to the ocean by the Telemark Canal. Heddalsvatnet is only 16 meters above sea level and only two locks at Skien were needed to allow ships to sail on the lake. The canal opened in 1861 and made Notodden into Norway's largest fresh water port. In the late 1800s seafaring vessels were constructed at the shores of Heddalsvatnet.

History
After the ice age the ocean was about 150 meter higher in this area. The ocean stretched like a fjord passed Heddalsvatnet all the way to Hjartdal. The first humans in central Telemark presumably travelled by boat deep inland along the fjords that are now gone. 

Post-glacial rebound eventually separated Heddalsvatnet from the ocean and turned it into a freshwater lake. The water in the lake gradually became freshwater around the Bronze Age, according to archaeologist Pål Nymoen.

In neolithic times Heddalsvatnet was still a saltwater fjord connected to the ocean, and was separated from the ocean around 1500 BC.

References

Lakes of Vestfold og Telemark
Notodden